Dan Christie Kingman (March 6, 1852 – November 14, 1916) was an officer in the United States Army who served as Chief of Engineers from 1913 to 1916.

Early life
Kingman was born in Dover, New Hampshire on March 6, 1852.

Military career
Entering the United States Military Academy, Kingman graduated second in the class of 1875 and was commissioned in the Corps of Engineers.  He served as an instructor at the Military Academy and as the engineer officer of the Army's Department of the Platte based at Fort Omaha. In 1883, he began the construction of roads and bridges in the new Yellowstone National Park. Kingman Pass on the Grand Loop Road between Mammoth Hot Springs and Norris is named for him.

Kingman directed improvements along the lower Mississippi River in 1886-90 and received the thanks of the Louisiana legislature for "splendid service rendered" during the 1890 flood. He oversaw harbor and fortification work on Lake Ontario in 1891-95 and improvements on the Tennessee River in the last half of that decade. In the latter assignment he initiated planning for federal cost-sharing with private hydroelectric-power investors for a lock and dam built below Chattanooga. Kingman oversaw substantial harbor improvements at Cleveland in 1901-05 and headed the Corps' Savannah District and Southeast Division in 1906-13. The Panama Canal was completed while he was Chief of Engineers. He retired from the army on March 6, 1916.

Later life
Kingman died November 14, 1916, in Atlantic City, New Jersey. He was buried with high military honors in Arlington National Cemetery. Among the pallbearers were Chief of Staff General Hugh L. Scott and two former Chiefs of Engineers, Generals Mackenzie and Bixby.

See also

 Kingman Pass
 North Entrance Road Historic District
 Kingman Island
 Kingman Park
 Kingman Lake
 Battery Kingman

Notes

This article contains public domain text from

Further reading

1852 births
United States Army generals
1916 deaths
United States Military Academy alumni
Burials at Arlington National Cemetery
People from Dover, New Hampshire
United States Army Corps of Engineers personnel
Military administration of Yellowstone National Park
Military personnel from New Hampshire